What's Missing  is a song written by Jimmy Jam and Terry Lewis and recorded by American recording artist Alexander O'Neal. It is the fourth single from the singer's self-titled debut studio album, Alexander O'Neal (1985). Following the moderately successful chart performances of the Alexander O'Neal singles "Innocent", "If You Were Here Tonight", and "A Broken Heart Can Mend", "What's Missing" was released as the album's fourth single.

Release 
Alexander O'Neal's 5th hit single and it reached #90 in the UK Singles Chart. In the United States, the single reached #8 on Billboard's Hot R&B/Hip-Hop Singles & Tracks.

Track listing 
 12" Single (TA 7191) 
"What's Missing (Extended Remix)" – 8:28
"What's Missing (Instrumental)" – 8:28
"Do You Wanna Like I Do" – 4:48

 7" Single (A 7191)
"What's Missing" – 4:06
"Do You Wanna Like I Do" – 4:48

Sales chart performance

Peak positions

References

External links
 

1986 singles
Alexander O'Neal songs
Songs written by Jimmy Jam and Terry Lewis
1985 songs
Song recordings produced by Jimmy Jam and Terry Lewis
Tabu Records singles